The Malaysian Meteorological Department (formerly abbreviated as MMD and now MetMalaysia) is an agency under the Ministry of Environment and Water (MEWA) which is responsible for providing various meteorological, climate and geophysical services to meet the needs of the nation in meteorological, climate and geophysical services for well-being, safety and sustainable development. MetMalaysia is responsible for monitoring the onshore, sea and air weather conditions continuously throughout the country. In addition, MetMalaysia issues forecasts, advice, weather and ocean alerts and climate surveys to reduce disaster risk. MetMalaysia also provides aviation meteorological services to launch aircraft operations and geophysical services to detect earthquakes and tsunami warnings for Malaysia.

Vision 
To be a leading meteorological, climate and geophysical center by 2030.

Mission 
To meet national needs in meteorological, climate and geophysical services for well-being, safety and sustainable development.

Strategic thrust 

Improve the effectiveness of weather services to reduce disaster risk
Strengthen flight meteorological services to ensure flight safety and well-being
Empower earthquake and tsunami services to reduce the risk of earthquake and tsunami disaster
Strengthen climate service for national prosperity
Empower human capital development

Organisation 

Malaysian Meteorological Department

Director General
Deputy Director General (Strategic & Technical)
Research & Technical Development Division
National Climate Centre
Technical Training Division
Strategic Planning & International Division
Meteorological Communication Division
Deputy Director General (Operation)
National Weather & Geophysic Operation Centre
Technical Weather & Geophysic Division
Radar & Satellite Meteorological Division
National Meteorological Aviation Centre
States Meteorological Office
Management Service Division
Meteorological Instrumentation & Atmospheric Science Centre
Corporate Communication Unit
Integrity Unit

References

External links

 

Federal ministries, departments and agencies of Malaysia
1946 establishments in British Malaya
Government agencies established in 1946
Governmental meteorological agencies in Asia
Ministry of Energy, Technology, Science, Climate Change and Environment (Malaysia)